Drosophila serrata is a species of fruit fly in the genus Drosophila, described by Malloch in 1927. 

It is endemic to Australia.

References

serrata
Insects of Australia